Alice Stevens Fisher (born January 27, 1967) is an American lawyer and partner at the Washington, D.C. office of Latham & Watkins LLP. Fisher served as Deputy United States Assistant Attorney General for the Criminal Division from 2001 to 2003 and as an Assistant Attorney General in the Department of Justice Criminal Division 
 for three years, from 2005 to May 23, 2008.
 
In 2010 Fisher was recognized as one of "Washington’s Most Influential Women Lawyers" by the National Law Journal  and was rated among the top 45 women lawyers under 45 in 2011 by The American Lawyer in 2011.

On May 13, 2017, Fisher was interviewed for the post of FBI Director following the dismissal of James Comey by President Donald Trump. Fisher withdrew her name from consideration the week of May 15, 2017.

Education
From 1985 to 1989 Fisher studied at Vanderbilt University in Nashville, Tennessee where she completed her bachelor's degree. In 1989, she began her studies at the Columbus School of Law (CUA Law) The Catholic University of America, in Washington, D.C. where she earned her J.D. in 1992.

Early career
According to statements at her May 12, 2005 AAG nomination hearing, Fisher graduated from law school in 1992 and then worked for "several years as an associate at Sullivan and Cromwell". Her clients included "corporations in civil litigation". She also represented an inmate on death row in a "habeas corpus appeal".

From 2001 to 2003, during the tenure of Michael Chertoff—then-United States Assistant Attorney General for the Criminal Division—who became her "longtime" mentor, Fisher was Deputy United States Assistant Attorney General for the Criminal Division. By 2005 she had become a partner in Latham & Watkins in Washington, D.C.

Latham & Watkins
By 2005, Fisher was a partner at the law firm of Latham & Watkins in Washington, D.C. Fisher specializes in "white collar criminal investigations, internal investigations and advising clients on a range of criminal matters", including: international criminal matters relating to alleged bribery under the Foreign Corrupt Practices Act (FCPA) and similar foreign laws; economic sanction and export control issues; and criminal matters such as healthcare fraud, accounting and securities fraud and procurement fraud. Fisher previously served as global co-chair of the firm's white-collar and government investigations practice group.

Assistant Attorney General for the Criminal Division

From 2001 to 2003, Fisher was Deputy United States Assistant Attorney General for the Criminal Division.

Fisher served as Assistant Attorney General for the Criminal Division at the Department of Justice (DOJ) for three years—from 2005 until she resigned on May 23, 2008, She served as an Assistant Attorney General during President George W. Bush's second term. She was initially appointed in a recess appointment on August 31, 2005, to head the Criminal Division in the Department of Justice. Fisher was confirmed by the Senate on September 19, 2006 in a 61–35 vote.

Nomination, hearing and confirmation
Fisher was nominated on March 29, 2005, and her nomination was sent to the Senate April 4, 2005. Her nomination was stalled by Michigan Senator Carl Levin over his inquiry into interrogation tactics at the Guantanamo Bay, Cuba, naval facility. She was confirmed by the senate on September 19, 2006.

According to an August 15, 2005 The New York Times article by Eric Lichtblau, Senate Democrats blocked Fisher's confirmation for months because a critical post now vacant for about four months because of concerns over her "possible role in overseeing detention policies at Guantánamo Bay, Cuba". Fisher and the Justice Department say she never took part in such meetings," According to the Times article, Senator Arlen Specter said "in the interview on Friday [August 12, 2005,] that he had concerns about the depth of criminal prosecution experience at the top of the Justice Department after the departure of" Deputy Attorney General James B. Comey, who left in August 2005 to be Lockheed Martin's new general counsel. Comey had been "a veteran prosecutor in Manhattan...Judiciary Committee members said that for the first time in memory, none of the most senior officials at the Justice Department"—Attorney General Alberto R. Gonzales, Timothy E. Flanigan, Robert D. McCallum, Jr., or Alice Fisher "would have experience as a criminal prosecutor."

Tenure

One of Fisher's first major investigations at the DOJ was the Jack Abramoff Indian lobbying scandal which dealt with congressional corruption. In January 2006, Fisher announced a deal in which Abramoff, a Republican lobbyist, pleaded guilty to three felonies, including conspiracy to bribe public officials, in return for Abramoff's cooperation in the wide-ranging investigation into congressional corruption.

In 2006, after a four-year investigation, federal prosecutors recommended to Fisher that three top Purdue Pharma executives be indicted on felony charges, including conspiracy to defraud the United States. According to a May 25, 2018 CNBC article, Rudolph W. Giuliani, who was representing Purdue Pharma at the time, held meetings with Fisher. Following these meetings, Fisher "chose not to pursue indictments against Purdue Pharma for their role in opioid abuse.,

In Florida in 2008, during the tenure of Fisher as AAG, then U.S. Attorney Alexander Acosta—who was federal prosecutor in Florida at that time—handled the "sex crimes case" of the multimillionaire financier Jeffrey Epstein who had pleaded guilty to soliciting prostitution. The lawyers for Epstein's unsuccessfully lobbied Fisher and other DOJ officials to stop the sex crimes prosecution. Epstein's lawyer Ken Starr later sent Fisher a letter appealing the U.S. Attorney's stated intention to notify the victims of an appending plea deal. Starr suggested this appeal was instrumental in stopping the notifications. Fisher said her office did not make any decisions related to victim notification, a decision ultimately made by U.S. Attorney's office.

According to The Washington Post, Fisher's signature initiatives during her tenure included "a crackdown on corporate bribes and a new strategy to attack international organized crime."

Speaking and publications

Fisher has published articles and spoken on criminal law topics such as the Criminalization of Corporate Conduct, the Foreign Corrupt Practices Act, government investigations, other international compliance issues and the legal industry.

Notes

References

External links
Biography at Latham Watkins 

|-

1967 births
Columbus School of Law alumni
Living people
United States Assistant Attorneys General for the Criminal Division
Vanderbilt University alumni
Lawyers from Washington, D.C.
American women lawyers
American lawyers